Alokdia Union is a union of Madhupur Upazila, Tangail District, Bangladesh. It is situated  7 km south of Madhupur and 53 km northeast of Tangail.

Demographics

According to Population Census 2011 performed by Bangladesh Bureau of Statistics, The total population of Alokdia union is 34588. There are  8969 households in total.

Education

The literacy rate of Alokdia Union is 37.3% (Male-38.9%, Female-35.7%).

See also
 Union Councils of Tangail District

References

Populated places in Dhaka Division
Populated places in Tangail District
Unions of Madhupur Upazila